Volga is a city in Brookings County, South Dakota, United States with a population of 2,113 at the 2020 census.

History
Volga was founded by the Western Town Lot Company on December 27, 1879, by Col. Arthur Jacoby.  It was originally named "Bandy Town" after the Bandy family, early settlers there.  Later, in 1880, the railroad assigned it the name "Volga", after the Volga River, in Russia.

Volga is mentioned in the juvenile novel The Long Winter by Laura Ingalls Wilder in the chapter titled "Pa Goes to Volga".

Geography
Volga is located at  (44.321994, -96.924565).

Volga has been assigned the ZIP code 57071 and the FIPS place code 67700.

Demographics

2010 census
As of the census of 2010, there were 1,768 people, 734 households, and 483 families living in the city. The racial makeup of the city was 98.2% White, 0.3% African American, 0.4% Native American, 0.3% Asian, 0.3% from other races, and 0.5% from two or more races. Hispanic or Latino people of any race were 2.7% of the population.

There were 734 households, of which 32.7% had children under the age of 18 living with them, 53.5% were married couples living together, 7.9% had a female householder with no husband present, 4.4% had a male householder with no wife present, and 34.2% were non-families. 28.5% of all households were made up of individuals, and 11% had someone living alone who was 65 years of age or older. The average household size was 2.41 and the average family size was 2.98.

The median age in the city was 33.8 years. 26.5% of residents were under the age of 18; 7.7% were between the ages of 18 and 24; 30.2% were from 25 to 44; 22.2% were from 45 to 64; and 13.5% were 65 years of age or older. The gender makeup of the city was 49.2% male and 50.8% female.

2000 census
As of the census of 2000, there were 1,435 people, 571 households, and 413 families living in the city. The population density was 1,862.1 people per square mile (719.6/km2). There were 596 housing units at an average density of 773.4 per square mile (298.9/km2). The racial makeup of the city was 98.75% White, 0.42% Native American, 0.21% Asian, and 0.63% from two or more races. Hispanic or Latino people of any race were 0.42% of the population.

There were 571 households, out of which 37.1% had children under the age of 18 living with them, 61.5% were married couples living together, 8.9% had a female householder with no husband present, and 27.5% were non-families. 24.7% of all households were made up of individuals, and 11.2% had someone living alone who was 65 years of age or older. The average household size was 2.51 and the average family size was 3.03.

In the city, the population was spread out, with 27.9% under the age of 18, 7.8% from 18 to 24, 30.8% from 25 to 44, 20.7% from 45 to 64, and 12.8% who were 65 years of age or older. The median age was 34 years. For every 100 females, there were 92.9 males. For every 100 females age 18 and over, there were 90.3 males.

As of 2000 the median income for a household in the city was $41,818, and the median income for a family was $51,131. Males had a median income of $31,083 versus $23,190 for females. The per capita income for the city was $18,237. About 3.4% of families and 6.2% of the population were below the poverty line, including 10.1% of those under age 18 and 8.7% of those age 65 or over.

Tourism

Old Timer's Day in Volga occurs in the second week of June every year and is capped off by an over-21-only street dance and many private parties.

The Brookings County Historical Museum is located in Volga, as well as a home of an early settler by the city park.

Education

Public schools
Volga is served by the Sioux Valley School District. The district has one elementary school, one middle school, and one high school. Students attend Sioux Valley High School. Three communities are included in the Sioux Valley school system: Bruce, Sinai, and Volga.

The Sioux Valley Cossacks football team is traditionally one of the strongest teams in the 11B classification.

As of 2020, the Sioux Valley Cossacks competitive cheer team has won 14 consecutive State A Cheer titles.

Private schools
Volga also has a private K through 8th school called the Volga Christian School.

Notable person
 Del Paddock, Major League Baseball player

See also
 List of cities in South Dakota

References

External links

 Sioux Valley School District

Cities in Brookings County, South Dakota
Cities in South Dakota
Populated places established in 1879
1879 establishments in Dakota Territory